Since is the third studio album by Richard Buckner. It was released by MCA records in 1998.

Background and writing 
"Jewelbomb" and "Boys the Night Will Bury You" were written during the composition of Devotion + Doubt. Early vocal/acoustic recordings of these two songs appear in a collection of 1996 demos (released by Overcoat Records in 2000 as a self-titled album).

Reception 
In a 4-star AllMusic review, Michael Gallucci wrote, "Richard Buckner's follow-up to his 1997 divorce odyssey Devotion + Doubt is a more upbeat affair, with questions of faith and being tossed into the electric mix. Moving from contemplative singer-songwriter treks ('Once') to blurry guitar rave-ups ('Believer')... Yet, for all of the creeping positivity going on within the grooves, Buckner sounds more weary than ever, his already delicate voice cracking under the pressure as he trudges his way through his own brand of electric folk music."

Eric Hage wrote in Trouser Press, "Since shakes off the previous outing's downer trip, with many of the tracks fleshed out into full alt-rock bluster. There's still plenty of acoustic rumination, but the album is characterized by such rave-ups as 'Jewelbomb,' 'Believer' and 'Goner w/ Souvenir.'"

For Entertainment Weekly, Will Hermes gave the album an 'A' rating, calling it a "stunner" with Buckner's voice "keening and careening like George Jones gone haywire."

In the Washington Post, Geoffrey Himes is confused by Buckner's intentions for the album, saying "he throws together cryptic phrases with little thought as to whether they cohere", "his voice constantly strays from its intended path and pitch", and that he "sings in such a flattened mumble that no emotions escape other than depressed ennui."

Track listing 
All songs written by Richard Buckner.

 Believer
 Faithful Shooter
 Ariel Ramirez
 Jewelbomb
 The Ocean Cliff Clearing
 Goner w/ Souvenir
 Slept
 Pico
 Coursed
 Lucky Buzz
 10-Day Room
 Brief & Boundless
 Raze
 Hand @ the Hem
 Boys, the Night Will Bury You
 Once

Personnel 
Richard Buckner – guitar, vocals
John McEntire – drums, percussion
Dave Schramm – guitar
Eric Heywood – pedal steel guitar
David Grubbs – piano, organ
JD Foster – producer, bass, moog, percussion, guitar, piano, mandolin

References 

1998 albums
Richard Buckner (musician) albums
MCA Records albums